Sebastian Arispe (born 26 August 1992) is a Peruvian swimmer. He competed in the men's 50 metre freestyle event at the 2018 FINA World Swimming Championships (25 m), in Hangzhou, China.

References

1992 births
Living people
Peruvian male freestyle swimmers
Place of birth missing (living people)
21st-century Peruvian people